Poisson is a French surname meaning "fish". Notable people with the surname include:

Abel-François Poisson, marquis de Marigny (1727–1781), French nobleman who served as the director general of the King's Buildings
Albert Poisson (1868–1893), French alchemist
David Poisson (politician) (born 1951), American politician
David Poisson (alpine skier) (1982–2017), French alpine skier
Émile Poisson (1905–1999), Beninese politician
Eric Poisson (born 1965), Canadian gravitational physicist
Georges Poisson (1924–2022), French art historian
Gilles Poisson, Canadian professional wrestler
Jean-Frédéric Poisson (born 1963), French politician
Jeanne Antoinette Poisson, Marquise de Pompadour (1721–1764), better known as Madame de Pompadour, a member of the French court and the official chief mistress of Louis XV from 1745 to her death
Pascal Poisson (born 1958), French cyclist
Paul Poisson (actor) (1658–1735), French actor
Paul Poisson (politician) (1887–1983), Canadian politician
Philippe Poisson (born 1984), better known as Phil Fish, Canadian video game designer
Philippe Poisson (actor) (1682–1743), French actor and playwright
Pierre-Marie Poisson (1876–1953), French sculptor and medallist
Raymond Poisson (1630–1690), French actor and playwright
Siméon Denis Poisson (1781–1840), French mathematician, geometer, and physicist

French-language surnames